The 2009–10 Czech First League, known as the Gambrinus liga for sponsorship reasons, was the seventeenth season of the Czech Republic's top-tier football. It started on 24 July 2009 and ended on 15 May 2010. Defending champions Slavia Prague could only finish seventh in the league, 21 points behind eventual winners Sparta Prague.

Team changes from last season
FK Viktoria Žižkov and FC Tescoma Zlín were relegated to the second division after finishing last and second to last, respectively, in the 2008–09 Czech First League.

Bohemians 1905 were promoted from the second division as champions. Second division runners-up FC Zenit Čáslav decided not to enter the Czech First League and sold the rights to 1. FC Slovácko, who were promoted in their place.

Team overview

Notes:
 Bohemians Prague were previously playing at FK Viktoria Stadion, but were not allowed to continue due to league rules regarding under-soil heating. Therefore, Bohemians played their home matches in the 2009–10 season at Stadion Evžena Rošického.
 Bohemians 1905 and Kladno played one home match each at Stadion Evžena Rošického after the winter break due to under-soil heating requirements.

Managerial changes

League table

Results

Top goalscorers

See also
 2009–10 Czech Cup
 2009–10 Czech 2. Liga

References

External links
 Official website 

Czech First League seasons
Czech
1